Smithville Lake is a   reservoir on the Little Platte branch of the Platte River in Clay County, Missouri near Smithville.  It provides the water supply for Smithville, Missouri and Plattsburg, Missouri.  Kansas City, Missouri has reserved a portion for its water supply.

The lake was built and is administered by the Kansas City office of the United States Army Corps of Engineers (which includes all of Missouri and Kansas, as well as small portions of Nebraska and Iowa) primarily for flood control. The lake is 10th largest of Corps lakes in the district, but third in terms of shoreline.

Smithville Dam was authorized in 1965.  Construction began in 1972 with the dam being completed in 1977.  Impoundment began in 1979.  The dam is of earthen construction and is 4000 feet long. At its crest it is 105 feet high and contains a maximum capacity of 246,500 acre-feet. It is owned and operated by the Corps of Engineers.

The Jerry L. Litton Visitor Center by the dam tells the history of the area, as well as has memorabilia about the Congressman who died in a plane crash on election night after winning the Democratic nomination for U.S. Senate in 1976.

References

Smithville Lake brochure

External links
Official Corps of Engineers site

Protected areas of Clay County, Missouri
Protected areas of Clinton County, Missouri
Buildings and structures in Clay County, Missouri
Buildings and structures in Clinton County, Missouri
Reservoirs in Missouri
Kansas City metropolitan area
Dams in Missouri
United States Army Corps of Engineers dams
Bodies of water of Clay County, Missouri
Bodies of water of Clinton County, Missouri